Jon Richardson Grows Up is a three-part, 2014 documentary series for Channel 4. It features comedian Jon Richardson and his comedian friend Matt Forde, in which the two examine modern aspects of becoming an adult. The first episode, dealing with relationships, aired on 15 September. The other two episodes, about money and children, were broadcast the following two weeks.

Episode list
Episode 1: Relationships

Air date: 15 September

Episode 2: Money

Air date: 22 September

Episode 3: Children

Air date: 29 September

References

External links
Official website

2014 British television series debuts
2014 British television series endings
2010s British documentary television series
Channel 4 documentaries
English-language television shows